John "Johnny" Price (25 October 1943 – 1995) was an English professional footballer who played as a winger.

References

External links
Stockport County history

1943 births
1995 deaths
Sportspeople from Easington, County Durham
Footballers from County Durham
English footballers
Association football midfielders
Burnley F.C. players
Stockport County F.C. players
Blackburn Rovers F.C. players
English Football League players